Pork meatball may refer to:

Lion's head (food)
Pork ball